Robat-e Toroq (also Romanized as Robāţ-e Ţoroq; also known as Ribāt-i-Turuq and Akbarābād-e Ţoroq) is a village in Sarjam Rural District, Ahmadabad District, Mashhad County, Razavi Khorasan Province, Iran. At the 2006 census, its population was 965, in 252 families.

References 

Populated places in Mashhad County